The Big Fib is an American game show hosted by Yvette Nicole Brown and featuring Rhys Darby. Based on the podcast of the same name, the series premiered on Disney+ on May 22, 2020.

Premise 
Two people claim to be experts in a similar field, and a child contestant asks them questions to determine which of the two is in fact not an expert and is "fibbing."

Development 
In early November 2019, it was revealed that Disney+ had ordered a game show consisting of 30 episodes based on then-named popular Gen-Z Media podcast Pants on Fire from Haymaker TV with Yvette Nicole Brown as host. In April 2020, it was revealed that part one of season one consists of 15 episodes.

Release
The 15-episode first part of the first and only season was released May 22, 2020 on Disney+. Part two of the first and only season premiered on Disney+ on October 23, 2020.

Episodes

Reception

Critical response 
Joel Keller of Decider declared that the game show is entertaining for both adults and kids, stating it manages to be "one of the better" family game shows, and claimed that Yvette Nicole Brown makes an agreeable host, while finding Rhys Darby amusing across his character. Emily Ashby of Common Sense Media rated the show 4 out of 5 stars, stating, "this fun and funny show has broad appeal and will entertain families, and the facts that are shared by the actual expert can teach the audience a thing or two. That said, parents can also use the show to talk with kids about honesty and the consequences of telling fibs in the real world."

Accolades

References

External links 

 
 

2020s American reality television series
2020s American children's game shows
2020 American television series debuts
2020 American television series endings
English-language television shows
Disney+ original programming
Television shows based on podcasts
Television series by Disney